Bruce DeSilva (born in Taunton, Massachusetts) is an American author and journalist.

Career 
DeSilva was a journalist for forty years, and has reviewed books for The New York Times.

As an author, DeSilva is best known for the Liam Mulligan series of mystery novels, including Rogue Island, Cliff Walk, Providence Rag, A Scourge of Vipers and The Dread Line. His novels won him the Edgar & Macavity Awards.

Personal life 
DeSilva is married to Patricia Smith, a poet. DeSilva lives in New Jersey.

Books in Order 
 Rogue Island
 Cliff Walk
 Providence Rag
 A Scourge of Vipers
 The Dread Line

References

External links
 Official website

21st-century American novelists
American male journalists
Year of birth missing (living people)
American male novelists
American crime fiction writers
American thriller writers
People from Taunton, Massachusetts
Edgar Award winners
Living people
Novelists from Massachusetts
Writers from Rhode Island
Macavity Award winners
21st-century American male writers
21st-century American non-fiction writers